Jarše may refer to the following settlements in Slovenia: 

Jarše District, a district of the City of Ljubljana
Jarše, Ljubljana, a former settlement in the City Municipality of Ljubljana
Jarše, Zagorje ob Savi, a settlement in the Municipality of Zagorje ob Savi
Nove Jarše, a neighborhood in the City Municipality of Ljubljana
Spodnje Jarše, Domžale, a settlement in the Municipality of Domžale
Spodnje Jarše, Ljubljana, a former settlement in the City Municipality of Ljubljana
Srednje Jarše, a settlement in the Municipality of Domžale
Stare Jarše, a former settlement in the City Municipality of Ljubljana
Zgornje Jarše, Domžale, a settlement in the Municipality of Domžale
Zgornje Jarše, Ljubljana, a former settlement in the City Municipality of Ljubljana